MegaZebra is a game development company located in Munich, Germany.
The company develops free-to-play games for social networks like Facebook and mobile devices, such as smartphones and tablets. As of July 2018, the company employs 55 people.

History
MegaZebra pioneered the social gaming space in Europe in late 2008. Behind MegaZebra is the team around Henning Kosmack (CEO) and Mark Gazecki (Chairman).
Since then, MegaZebra developed several cross-platform games for mobile devices and social networks like Facebook.

In September 2009 the company got backed by the founders of Web.de through Kizoo Technology Ventures.

With Mahjong Trails they launched their first game, reaching more than two million monthly players in January 2011. Today the game has still more than 2 million monthly active players.

In March 2011 MegaZebra raised ‘multiple millions Euros’  in a second round of funding, led by Doughty Hanson Technology Ventures. Furthermore, Kizoo Technology Ventures participated again, alongside private investor Markus Stolz.

With Gaute Godager, founder of Funcom, and Jürgen Goeldner, two Gaming veterans joined the company`s board of directors in January 2012. 
Both have a long-standing experience in the gaming sector. Apart from Goeldner and Godager, the MegaZebra board consists of Nigel Grierson from Doughty Hanson, Matthias Hornberger from Atevia, and Mark Gazecki of the founders.

MegaZebra launched its second hit game Solitaire Castle in late 2011. Following in the footsteps of Mahjong Trails, it reached more than  1.5 million monthly active users in October 2012. and reached more the 2 million user per month in January 2013.

1 year later MegaZebra launched Suburbia, which reached 2 million MAU in early 2014. With Suburbia, MegaZebra was the first company to combine episodic, TV-style content with simulation game mechanics. but you can only complete up to episode 5 episode 6 has been in development for about 4 years

MegaZebra’s latest game Solitaire Chronicles is the first cross-platform title, that is available on the web and on mobile devices. Recently it won the Tabby Award in the category Best iPad game: Cards, Casino and Dice.

Figures

According to AppData, in January 2011 MegaZebra is one of the top 25 fastest growing developers on Facebook, reaching almost 4 million monthly users and is with more than half a million daily active users, among the Top 3 European developers in terms of daily active users.
With Mahjong Trails and Solitaire Castle, MegaZebra has now two games exceeding the 2 million monthly active user mark.

Awards

In 2015 Solitaire Chronicles, the first mobile game of the company, won the Tabby Award for the category “Best iPad game: Cards, Casino and Dice”.

Games

 Desperate Housewives: The Game 
 Mahjong Trails 
 Suburbia 2
 Solitaire Chronicles      
 Solitaire Castle       
 Mahjong

References

External links
 Official MegaZebra website

Video game development companies
Virtual economies
Facebook games
Mobile games
Video game companies of Germany